In the mathematical field of real analysis, the monotone convergence theorem is any of a number of related theorems proving the convergence of monotonic sequences (sequences that are non-decreasing or non-increasing) that are also bounded. Informally, the theorems state that if a sequence is increasing and bounded above by a supremum, then the sequence will converge to the supremum; in the same way, if a sequence is decreasing and is bounded below by an infimum, it will converge to the infimum.

Convergence of a monotone sequence of real numbers

Lemma 1
If a sequence of real numbers is increasing and bounded above, then its supremum is the limit.

Proof
By assumption,  is non-empty and bounded above. By the least-upper-bound property of real numbers,  exists and is finite.

Lemma 2
If a sequence of real numbers is decreasing and bounded below, then its infimum is the limit.

Proof
The proof is similar to the proof for the case when the sequence is increasing and bounded above,

Theorem
If  is a monotone sequence of real numbers (i.e., if an ≤ an+1 for every n ≥ 1 or an ≥ an+1 for every n ≥ 1), then this sequence has a finite limit if and only if the sequence is bounded.

Proof
 "If"-direction: The proof follows directly from the lemmas.
 "Only If"-direction: By (ε, δ)-definition of limit, every sequence  with a finite limit  is necessarily bounded.

Convergence of a monotone series

Theorem
If for all natural numbers j and k, aj,k is a non-negative real number and aj,k ≤ aj+1,k, then

The theorem states that if you have an infinite matrix of non-negative real numbers such that
the columns are weakly increasing and bounded, and
for each row, the series whose terms are given by this row has a convergent sum,
then the limit of the sums of the rows is equal to the sum of the series whose term k is given by the limit of column k (which is also its supremum). The series has a convergent sum if and only if the (weakly increasing) sequence of row sums is bounded and therefore convergent.

As an example, consider the infinite series of rows

where n approaches infinity (the limit of this series is e). Here the matrix entry in row n and column k is

the columns (fixed k) are indeed weakly increasing with n and bounded (by 1/k!), while the rows only have finitely many nonzero terms, so condition 2 is satisfied; the theorem now says that you can compute the limit of the row sums  by taking the sum of the column limits, namely .

Beppo Levi's lemma
The following result is due to Beppo Levi, who proved a slight generalization in 1906 of an earlier result by Henri Lebesgue. By definition,  contains the set  and all Borel subsets of

Theorem
Consider a pointwise non-decreasing sequence  of -measurable non-negative functions , i.e., for every  and every ,

Set the pointwise limit of the sequence  to be . That is, for every  ,

Then  is -measurable and

Remark 1. The integrals may be finite or infinite.

Remark 2. The theorem remains true if its assumptions hold -almost everywhere. In other words, it is enough that there is a null set  such that the sequence  non-decreases for every  To see why this is true, we start with an observation that allowing the sequence  to pointwise non-decrease almost everywhere causes its pointwise limit  to be undefined on some null set . On that null set,  may then be defined arbitrarily, e.g. as zero, or in any other way that preserves measurability. To see why this will not affect the outcome of the theorem, note that since  we have, for every 

 and 

provided that  is -measurable. (These equalities follow directly from the definition of Lebesgue integral for a non-negative function).

Remark 3. Under assumptions of the theorem,

(Note that the second chain of equalities follows from Remark 5).

Remark 4. The proof below does not use any properties of Lebesgue integral except those established here. The theorem, thus, can be used to prove other basic properties, such as linearity, pertaining to Lebesgue integration.

Remark 5 (monotonicity of Lebesgue integral). In the proof below, we apply the monotonic property of Lebesgue integral to non-negative functions only. Specifically (see Remark 4), let the functions  be -measurable.

If  everywhere on  then

If  and  then

Proof. Denote  the set of simple -measurable functions  such that
 everywhere on  

1. Since  we have

By definition of Lebesgue integral and the properties of supremum,

2. Let  be the indicator function of the set  It can be deduced from the definition of Lebesgue integral that

if we notice that, for every   outside of  Combined with the previous property, the inequality  implies

Proof
This proof does not rely on Fatou's lemma; however, we do explain how that lemma might be used. Those not interested in this independency of the proof may skip the intermediate results below.

Intermediate results

Lebesgue integral as measure
Lemma 1. Let  be a measurable space. Consider a simple -measurable non-negative function . For a subset , define

Proof
Monotonicity follows from Remark 5. Here, we will only prove countable additivity, leaving the rest up to the reader. Let , where all the sets  are pairwise disjoint. Due to simplicity,

for some finite non-negative constants  and pairwise disjoint sets  such that . By definition of Lebesgue integral,

Since all the sets  are pairwise disjoint, the countable additivity of 
gives us

Since all the summands are non-negative, the sum of the series, whether this sum is finite or infinite, cannot change if summation order does. For that reason,

as required.

"Continuity from below"
The following property is a direct consequence of the definition of measure.

Lemma 2.

is a non-decreasing chain with all its sets -measurable. Then

Proof of theorem
Step 1. We begin by showing that  is –measurable.

Note. If we were using Fatou's lemma, the measurability would follow easily from Remark 3(a).

Thus,

Since -algebras are, by definition, closed under countable intersections, this shows that  is -measurable, and the integral  is well defined (and possibly infinite).

Step 2. We will first show that 

By monotonicity (or, more precisely, its narrower version established in Remark 5; see also Remark 4) of Lebesgue integral,

and

Note that the limit on the right exists (finite or infinite) because, due to monotonicity (see Remark 5 and Remark 4), the sequence is non-decreasing.

End of Step 2.

We now prove the reverse inequality. We seek to show that

.

Proof using Fatou's lemma. Per Remark 3, the inequality we want to prove is equivalent to

But the latter follows immediately from Fatou's lemma, and the proof is complete.

Independent proof. To prove the inequality without using Fatou's lemma, we need some extra machinery. Denote  the set of simple -measurable functions  such that

Step 3. Given a simple function  and a real number , define

Step 3a. To prove the first claim, let , for some finite collection of pairwise disjoint measurable sets  such that , some (finite) non-negative constants , and  denoting the indicator function of the set .

For every   holds if and only if  Given that the sets  are pairwise disjoint,

Since the pre-image  of the Borel set
 under the measurable function  is measurable, and -algebras, by definition, are closed under finite intersection and unions, the first claim follows.

Step 3b. To prove the second claim, note that, for each  and every , 

Step 3c. To prove the third claim, we show that .

Indeed, if, to the contrary, then an element

exists such that , for every .

But by initial assumption, . This is a contradiction.

Step 4. For every simple -measurable non-negative function ,

To prove this, define . By "continuity from below" (Lemma 2),

as required.

Step 5. We now prove that, for every ,

for every .

Taking the limit as  yields

as required.

Step 6. We are now able to prove the reverse inequality, i.e.

Applying the definition of Lebesgue integral and the inequality established in Step 5, we have

The proof is complete.

See also
Infinite series
Dominated convergence theorem

Notes

Articles containing proofs
Theorems in calculus
Sequences and series
Theorems in real analysis
Theorems in measure theory

it:Passaggio al limite sotto segno di integrale#Integrale di Lebesgue